Beacon Hill Tunnel is a railway tunnel in Hong Kong on the original Kowloon–Canton Railway, linking Kowloon Tong to its immediate south and Sha Tin to its north. The nearest stations to the south and north of the tunnel are Kowloon Tong and Tai Wai respectively. Today, the tunnel carries the MTR East Rail line metro service and through trains to Mainland China.

There are actually two tunnels of this name. The first opened in 1910 and operated until its replacement came into operation following its 1981 completion.

History

First tunnel
A team of surveyors was commissioned to plan the route for the KCR British Section in 1905. Two routes were proposed:
Construction of a tunnel 1.5 mile (2.4 km) long through Beacon Hill, then following the west coast of Tolo Harbour
Routing through western New Territories and Castle Peak Bay

Although option two was less of an engineering challenge, the overall route was longer, and passed through less economically active areas; therefore option one was selected. Works on the  railway to the border started early 1906. Construction of the tunnel, referred to as Tunnel No.2 in the plan (since it was the second tunnel out from the Kowloon terminus), was the greatest engineering project in Asia of its time. 

Construction of the tunnel presented great engineering challenges during construction of the line, and local workers were very reluctant to work underground due to feng shui-related objections. In the end, Italian workers were employed. The tunnel cost £298,500 to build and opened with the rest of the line on 1 October 1910, together with four smaller tunnels along the line. Throughout its operating life, the tunnel was noted for its fume problems, due to its relatively steep gradient of 1%.

The tunnel was closed upon completion of the new one, and is now partially occupied by several town gas pipelines, operated by The Hong Kong and China Gas Company. The potential for damage to the pipes was a factor in determining the intensity of blasting during construction of the Sha Tin to Central Link, thereby protecting the old tunnel as a whole.

Second tunnel
As part of the modernisation of the KCR, under reformist Governor Murray MacLehose, a double-tracked, electrified tunnel was built 30 to 40 metres west of the original one. Work started in 1978. The main contractor was Aoki Corporation and the tunnel was built at a cost of about HK$78 million. It was broken through on 23 April 1980. The tunnel was completed by 1981, enabling the KCRC to introduce a metro-standard service to serve the rapidly growing new towns north of the mountain range.

Dimensions

First tunnel
 single track
 2.2 km long
 horseshoe-shaped, 5.2 metres wide by 5.8 metres high above rail level.
 up to 427 metres below ground
 tunnel lining upgraded in 1982 and 2008

Second tunnel
 double track
 2.3 km long
 horseshoe-shaped, 11 metres wide by 9 metres high

References

Bibliography

1910 establishments in Hong Kong
1981 establishments in Hong Kong
Railway tunnels in Hong Kong
Tunnels completed in 1910
Tunnels completed in 1981